Jacques Samy Tioye (born 9 January 1985 in Abidjan) is an Ivorian footballer who plays for Sombat FC.

Career
Tioye began his career with EFYM and joined in January 2008 to Thai club Muangthong United F.C. He left after on season his club Muangthong United F.C. to sign for League rival Bangkok United F.C., who played one year before signed in February 2010 for Cameroonian club Sombat FC.

Honours
Thailand Division 1 League: 2008 with Muangthong United F.C.

References

1985 births
Living people
Ivorian footballers
Jacques Tioye
Expatriate footballers in Thailand
Footballers from Abidjan
Expatriate footballers in Cameroon
Association football forwards
Ivorian expatriate sportspeople in Thailand
Jacques Tioye